Supercard of Honor XII was a professional wrestling pay-per-view event produced by American promotion Ring of Honor (ROH), which took place Saturday, April 7, 2018, at the UNO Lakefront Arena in New Orleans, Louisiana. Wrestlers from New Japan Pro-Wrestling (NJPW) – with whom ROH has a partnership – also appeared at the event.  Also, wrestlers from the Japan based women's promotion World Wonder Ring Stardom appeared on the show as part of the tournament to crown the inaugural Women of Honor Champion – ROH's first women's championship.

Background
This professional wrestling event featured professional wrestling matches, which involve different wrestlers from pre-existing scripted feuds, plots, and storylines that play out on ROH's television program, Ring of Honor Wrestling'. Wrestlers portray villains or heroes as they follow a series of events that build tension and culminate in a wrestling match or series of matches.

Storylines
At Dominion 6.11 in Osaka-jo Hall during Kenny Omega’s IWGP Heavyweight Championship match against champ Kazuchika Okada, Cody Rhodes would come out with intentions to throw to towel in on behalf of Omega. The Young Bucks would stop this but Omega would fail to win the match. At the G1 Special in USA Omega would return the favor looking to throw in the towel on behalf of Cody during his IWGP Title shot against Okada, Cody would lose the match. At New Year’s Dash!! after winning a 10-man tag match Cody would look to attack Kota Ibushi but Ibushi was saved by Omega. At The New Beginning in Sapporo (2018) Omega would lose the IWGP United States Heavyweight Championship to “Switchblade” Jay White. After the match Hangman Page would look to challenge the new champ but was stopped by Kenny. This brought out Bullet Club member Cody, Marty Scurll, and Matt Jackson. In the chaos Omega accidentally push Matt on his injured back. Cody then hit Omega with Cross Rhodes and looked to attack Omega with a chair but was saved by Ibushi. Omega and Ibushi embraced and reunited the Golden Lovers. At Honor Rising Cody, Page, and Scurll beat the Golden Lovers and Chase Owens, the next the Lovers beat Scurll and Cody. Afterwards, the Young Bucks announced their move to the heavyweight division and challenged Ibushi and Omega. At ROH 16th Anniversary Show Omega dressed as Bury the Drug Free Bear attacked Cody, afterward Brandi Rhodes kissed Kenny. At Strong Style Evolved the Golden Lovers beat the Young Bucks, after the match Cody pushed Nick Jackson in a very similar Omega had pushed Matt. At Sakura Genesis Page and Cody beat the Golden Lovers.

Results

Women of Honor Championship tournament

See also
2018 in professional wrestling
List of Ring of Honor pay-per-view events

References

External links

Professional wrestling in New Orleans
Events in New Orleans
2018 in Louisiana
ROH Supercard of Honor
April 2018 events in the United States
2018 Ring of Honor pay-per-view events